WWE Originals is a soundtrack album by WWE. Released on January 13, 2004 by Columbia Records, it features original songs recorded by various WWE wrestlers. The album was a commercial success, reaching number 12 on the US Billboard 200.

Reception

Music website AllMusic categorised WWE Originals as "contemporary pop/rock" and rap rock, with writer Johnny Loftus identifying styles such as "soft-focus piano pop", dance-pop and hip hop on the album. Slam! Wrestling's John Powell also identified the genres of electronic and power ballad on the collection, while Billboard magazine noted a dominance of "in-your-face rap".

Release
WWE Originals was released by Columbia Records on January 13, 2004. Initial pressings of the album also featured a bonus DVD, which featured behind-the-scenes footage of the making of the album and more.

Reception

Commercial
In the United States, WWE Originals reached number 12 on the Billboard 200.

Critical
Music website AllMusic awarded WWE Originals three out of five stars. Reviewer Johnny Loftus criticised tracks such as Stacy Keibler's "Why Can't We Just Dance?" and Kurt Angle's "I Don't Suck (Really)", identifying them as proof of some performers' musical inability. However, Loftus praised the "amusing" skits performed by Stone Cold Steve Austin, as well as a number of tracks including "I Just Want You" by Trish Stratus and "Put a Little A** on It" by Rikishi.

John Powell of Slam! Wrestling was more critical, describing the compositions on the album as "generic, cookie-cutter productions without any soul, character or style" and criticising the performances in general. In particular, Powell criticised songs such as The Dudley Boyz' "We've Had Enough", Trish Stratus' "I Just Want You", Lita's "When I Get You Alone" and Stacy Keibler's "Why Can't We Just Dance?"; however, he did praise the performances of John Cena and Lilian Garcia.

Michael Paoletta of Billboard magazine described WWE Originals as "mixed, very mixed". Paoletta noted a dominance of hip hop music on the album, claiming that the pop and rock songs were of higher quality, particularly those performed by divas Keibler, Stratus and Lita.

Track listing
Samples

 "Basic Thugonomics" contains a sample of "Two,Three, Break" by The B-Boys.

See also

Music in professional wrestling

References

Originals
WWE Originals
WWE Originals
WWE Originals
Albums produced by Mike Post